A squad is a small military unit.

Squad may also refer to:

Organizations 
 Squad (company), a Mexican company that developed the video game Kerbal Space Program
 The Squad (Irish Republican Army unit), a unit founded in 1919 by Michael Collins
 The Squad (United States Congress), a nickname for nine progressive members of the US House of Representatives

Film and television
 The Squad (1981 film), an Australian television film
 The Squad (2011 film), a Colombian horror film
 The Squad (2015 film), a French action film
 Squad (film), a 2021 Indian action film
 The Squad (TV series), a 1980 British teen drama series

Other media
 Squad (app), a social-media app acquired by Twitter
 Squad (video game), a 2020 first-person shooter
 The Squad, a 1990 novel by David Sherman
 The Squad, a superhero team in the Malibu Comics Ultraverse

See also 
 Death squad, an armed group that conducts extrajudicial killings or forced disappearances
 Hit Squad (disambiguation)
 Police car, also known as squad car
 Rescue squad, a unit that performs technical rescues and other emergency services
 Squadron (disambiguation)
 Team, in the context of sports, often called a squad